Gianluca Freddi (born 29 March 1989) is an Italian footballer playing as a defender for Robur Siena.

Biography
A product of the A.S. Roma youth academy, Freddi usually plays as defender. Freddi made his debut against U.C. Sampdoria as a starter, in a goalless draw on 22 April 2006.

In August 2007, he was sold to Grosseto in co-ownership bid, for a peppercorn fee of €500. In June 2008 Grosseto bought Freddi outright for around €65,000.

On 20 January 2012, he moved to Serie B side Reggina Calcio for an undisclosed fee after his four-and-a-half-year spell at Grosseto. He took no.5 shirt vacated by Lorenzo Burzigotti.

On 23 July 2013, he joined Brescia Calcio on a one-year deal with an option for a second year.

On 1 September 2014 Freddi joined Lega Pro club Novara Calcio in a 2-year contract. He won promotion to Serie B with club in 2015.

On 31 August 2015 he was sold to Lega Pro club U.S. Lecce, where he spent one and a half seasons.

On 31 January 2017 he moved to Robur Siena on a free transfer.

Notes

References

1989 births
Living people
Italian footballers
Italy youth international footballers
A.S. Roma players
F.C. Grosseto S.S.D. players
Reggina 1914 players
Brescia Calcio players
Novara F.C. players
U.S. Lecce players
Serie A players
Serie B players
Footballers from Rome
Association football defenders